Trichoepithelioma is a neoplasm of the adnexa of the skin. Its appearance is similar to basal cell carcinoma.

One form has been mapped to chromosome 9p21.

Types 
Trichoepitheliomas may be divided into the following types:

 Multiple familial trichoepithelioma
 Solitary trichoepithelioma
 Desmoplastic trichoepithelioma

Pathology 
Trichoepitheliomas consists of nests of basaloid cells, with palisading. They lack the myxoid stroma and artefactual clefting seen in basal cell carcinoma.  Mitoses are uncommon when compared to basal cell carcinoma.

Diagnosis
Trichoepiteliomas often contain Merkel cells; an immunostain for CK20 can be used to demonstrate this.

See also 
 Trichoblastoma
 Pilomatricoma
 CYLD cutaneous syndrome
 List of cutaneous conditions
 List of cutaneous neoplasms associated with systemic syndromes

References

External links 

Epidermal nevi, neoplasms, and cysts